State Route 312 (SR 312) is a secondary state route in Hamilton and Bradley counties in the US state of Tennessee that runs from Birchwood to Cleveland. The route runs east and west, however, much of the route in Hamilton County runs north and south.

Route description 

The route runs through the community of Snow Hill, and about  later comes to a four-way intersection with Ooltewah-Georgetown Road, a major connector road between the communities of Ooltewah and Georgetown. The route then crosses Mahan Gap in White Oak Mountain, and about  later crosses into Bradley County, where it becomes known as Harrison Pike. About  later it intersects with Bancroft Road, a connector to McDonald. The route continues for another  through a rural residential area, before turning sharp east, and entering the community of Prospect. About  later the route crosses I-75, but does not interchange. The route then continues for another , crossing Candies Creek, Candies Creek Ridge in a gap, and entering Cleveland, before coming to an intersection with US 11 Bypass (Keith Street). The route continues east as Inman Street for another  before meeting its eastern terminus with US 11/US 64 (Ocoee Street, Broad Street) in downtown Cleveland. Also at this intersection US 64 splits off from US 11, and continues east as Inman Street.

Major intersections

References

312
Transportation in Hamilton County, Tennessee
Transportation in Bradley County, Tennessee